Bjarte Hjelmeland (born 24 February 1970) is a Norwegian actor and theatre director. He was born in Bergen. He made his stage debut in 1991 at Oslo Nye Teater, and also had notable roles at the National Theatre, Rogaland Teater, Torshovteatret, Den Nationale Scene and Chateau Neuf. In 2008 he was hired as director of Den Nationale Scene.

Films include his screen debut Byttinger (1991), Livredd (1997) and Desperate bekjennelser (1998). Television series include Vestavind (1994–1995), the talk show Mandagsklubben (1996–1997) and Hvaler. He was a judge on Series 6 of Norske_Talenter. He has also released music albums.

Hjelmeland is openly gay.

References

External links

1970 births
Living people
Actors from Bergen
Norwegian male stage actors
Norwegian theatre directors
Norwegian male comedians
Norwegian LGBT actors
Gay actors
Norwegian male film actors
Theatre people from Bergen
21st-century Norwegian male singers
21st-century Norwegian singers
21st-century LGBT people